Insaaf Apne Lahoo Se is a 1994 Bollywood film starring Shatrughan Sinha, Sanjay Dutt, Shekhar Suman, Farah Naaz and Gulshan Grover. It was released on 18 March 1994.

Plot

Mahendra Pratap Singh is a lawyer who live a wealthy lifestyle. He gets married again after his wife's death. The woman he marries is a widow named Geeta, who has a son named Devilal. Mahendra Pratap dislikes Devilal. Finally he asks Geeta to make a choice between him and her son. Seeing her mother in such a difficult situation Devilal decides to leave his mother himself so that she would be rescued from making a choice. But, while leaving he threatens Mahendra and swears to take revenge.

Thereafter Geeta is arrested on charge of murder of another lawyer. The murdered lawyers and Mahendra gave testimony against her in the court. Pregnant Geeta is sentenced to 14 years of imprisonment. While in jail she gives birth to a son and names hin Raju. She instills hatred against Mahendra in Raju, right from his childhood. Raju and Devi try to avenge against their father Mahendra. But they find out that the main culprit is not their father but someone else.

Cast
Shatrughan Sinha as Devilal "Deva"
Sanjay Dutt as Raju
Kulbhushan Kharbanda as Mahendra Pratap Singh
Gita Siddharth as Mrs. Geeta Pratap Singh
Shekhar Suman as Mohan Prasad
Kader Khan as Hardwarilal
Gulshan Grover as Jimmy
Beena Banerjee as Mrs. Roopa Saxena
Bob Christo as Bob

Soundtrack

References

External links

1994 films
Films scored by Laxmikant–Pyarelal
1990s Hindi-language films